Test Drive: Eve of Destruction (Driven to Destruction in Europe) is a racing video game developed by Monster Games and published by Atari Interactive for Xbox and PlayStation 2. The game has many North American races that include a figure 8 race, last man standing race, school bus races, demolition derby, and many more.

Development
The game was announced in April 2004 as a PlayStation 2 title. The Xbox version was announced in June.

Reception

Test Drive: Eve of Destruction received "average" reviews on both platforms according to the review aggregation website Metacritic.

References

External links
 

2004 video games
Atari games
Monster Games games
Multiplayer and single-player video games
PlayStation 2 games
Eve of Destruction
Vehicular combat games
Video games developed in the United States
Video games set in Minnesota
Video games with custom soundtrack support
Xbox games